Acrotaenia latipennis is a species of tephritid or fruit flies in the genus Acrotaenia of the family Tephritidae.

Distribution
Brazil.

References

Tephritinae
Insects described in 1830
Diptera of South America